Joseph Rodriguez may refer to:

 Joseph Rodriguez (photographer), American documentary photographer
 Joseph C. Rodríguez (1928–2005), United States Army soldier and Medal of Honor recipient
 Joseph H. Rodriguez (born 1930), United States federal judge
 Joseph Rodriguez (footballer), French football player, 1930s